Sidney Albert Normanton (20 August 1926 – 1995), known as Skinner Normanton, was an English coal miner and part-time footballer who played for Barnsley and Halifax Town of the English Football League.

Throughout his career, Normanton gained a reputation for a highly aggressive and physically uncompromising style of play, earning him a "hard man" image on and off the field. A heavy tackle contested with Alex Forbes in 1952 left Normanton with torn knee ligaments, which hastened the end of his Football League career. 

Normanton was brought to wider notice in the writings of Michael Parkinson.

References

External links
 

1926 births
1995 deaths
English footballers
Footballers from Barnsley
Association football defenders
Halifax Town A.F.C. players
Barnsley F.C. players
English Football League players
Leeds United F.C. wartime guest players
British coal miners
Grimethorpe Athletic F.C. players